The Trade Act of 1974 (codified at ) was passed to help industry in the United States become more competitive or phase workers into other industries or occupations.

Fast track authority

The Trade Act of 1974 created fast track authority for the President to negotiate trade agreements that Congress can approve or disapprove but cannot amend or filibuster. The Act provided the President with tariff and non-tariff trade barrier negotiating authority for the Tokyo Round of multilateral trade negotiations.  Gerald Ford was the President at the time. The fast track authority created under the Act was set to expire in 1980, was extended for 8 years in 1979, was renewed again in 1988 until 1993 to allow for the negotiation of the Uruguay Round within the framework of the General Agreement on Tariffs and Trade (GATT), and was again extended to 16 April 1994, a day after the Uruguay Round concluded in the Marrakech Agreement transforming the GATT into the World Trade Organization (WTO). It was restored in 2002 by the Trade Act of 2002. The Obama Administration sought renewal for fast track authority in 2012.

Power to counteract unfair foreign trade practices

It also gave the President broad authority to counteract injurious and unfair foreign trade practices.
Section 135 of the Act provides for the establishment of the Labor Advisory Committee for Trade Negotiations and Trade Policy (LAC) whose duty is to provide advice and information to the Office of the United States Trade Representative (USTR) and the Secretary of Labor regarding the U.S.'s negotiating objectives and bargaining positions before the nation enters into trade agreements with foreign countries. LAC is to meet on any trade agreement and provide a report to the President, the Congress, and the Office of the USTR at the conclusion of negotiations.
Section 201 of the Act requires the International Trade Commission to investigate petitions filed by domestic industries or workers claiming injury or threat of injury due to expanding imports. Investigations must be completed within 6 months. If such injury is found, restrictive measures may be implemented. Action under Section 201 is allowed under the GATT escape clause, GATT Article XIX.
Section 301 was designed to eliminate unfair foreign trade practices that adversely affect U.S. trade and investment in both goods and services. Under Section 301, the President must determine whether the alleged practices are unjustifiable, unreasonable, or discriminatory and burden or restrict U.S. commerce. If the President determines that action is necessary, the law directs that all appropriate and feasible action within the President’s power should be taken to secure the elimination of the practice. A Special 301 Report is prepared annually by the Office of the USTR which must identify a list of "Priority Foreign Countries", those countries judged to have inadequate intellectual property laws; these countries may be subject to sanctions. This has been issued every year beginning in 1989 since the enactment of the Omnibus Foreign Trade and Competitiveness Act of 1988 and the Uruguay Round Agreements Act (enacted in 1994). (See also China–United States trade war.)

See also
 Trade Expansion Act
 Smoot-Hawley Tariff Act
 Trade Agreements Act of 1979

References

External links
 Trade Act of 1974 (PDF/details) as amended in the GPO Statute Compilations collection

United States federal trade legislation
1974 in American law
1974 in the United States
1974 in international relations
Foreign trade of the United States
January 1975 events in the United States